Juzizhou Subdistrict is a subdistrict of Yuelu District in Changsha, Hunan, China. It is historically the Shuiluzhou Subdistrict formed in 1950s. The subdistrict has two villages and eight communities under its jurisdiction.

The subdistrict of Juzizhou is located on the east side of Yuelu Mountain and on the west bank of Xiang River. It starts from the Orange Isle in the east and reaches the Yuelu Mountain ridge in the west, connects to the South Campus of Hunan Normal University in the south, and reaches the Juzizhou Bridge and Fenglin No.1 Road in the north. There are Yuelu Mountain, Orange Isle, Yuelu Academy, the site of Xinmin Institute and other tourist attractions. There are key universities such as Hunan University and Hunan Normal University. There are National Supercomputing Center in Changsha, Hunan Academy of Chinese Medicine, the Changsha Research Institute of Mining and metallurgy, Hunan provincial Agency of Democratic Parties, and the Fourth Hospital of Changsha and other health research institutions.

History
The subdistrict of Juzizhou was originally called Shuiluzhou Subdistrict. It was designated as Yuelu District in the early 1950s. In 1953, the Minzhu Jianzheng Subdistrict was transferred from Yuelu District to the West District. in March 1960,   the Xianfeng People's Commune was established in the West District and the Shuiluzhou Office was named to the sixth branch of Xianfeng People's Commune. In September 1961, the urban people's commune was revoked and the name of Shuiluzhou Office was restored. In 1968, the isle of Shuilu (Shuilu Zhou) was renamed to Orange Isle (Juzi Zhou), and the subdistrict of Juzizhou was established in the Orange Isle. In 1972, the subdistrict was transferred to Yuelu District from the West District. In 1975, the districts of Yuelu and West were amalgamated to form West District, which was under the jurisdiction of the West District.

Adjusting districts in July 1996, the West District was abolished, it was replaced by Yuelu District, the subdistrict was under the jurisdiction of Yuelu District. At the beginning of its establishment, the subdistrict's office was located at No.10, Juzhou Xincun Village (north of the Juzizhou Bridge), and it was co-located with the police station. When the Juzizhou Bridge was built in 1970, its office of the district was demolished. In 1972, its office was moved to No.88, Juzhou Zhongcun Village, south of the branch bridge (borrowed from the Catholic Church). In September 1993, its office was moved from the Orange Isle to No.99 Xinmin Road on the west bank of Xiang River. In 2001, Yuelu Fishery Farm was merged into the subdistrict. In February 2002, its office was moved from Xinmin Road to the office building of Yuelu Fishery Farm.

Subdivisions
The subdistrict of Juzizhou has eight communities and two villages under its administration.

8 communities
 Baziqiang Community
 Houhu Community
 Shida Community
 Shimenlou Community
 Tianfeng Community
 Xinminlu Community
 Xuetangpo Community
 Yuenancun Community

2 villages
 Houhu Xincun Village
 Tianma Village

External links
 Official Website （Chinese / 中文）

References

Yuelu District
Subdistricts of Changsha